The Copyright Act 1842 (5 & 6 Vict. c. 45) was an Act of Parliament in the United Kingdom, which received royal assent on 1 July 1842 and was repealed in 1911. It revised and consolidated the copyright law of the United Kingdom.
It was one of the Copyright Acts 1734 to 1888.

Duration of copyright
It provided that in future the copyright of every book published in the lifetime of its author would endure for the remainder of the author's life and for a further seven years after their death. If this period was less than forty-two years from the first publication, then the copyright would persist for a full forty-two years regardless of the date of their death. Any work published after the author's death would remain the copyright of the owner of the manuscript for the same forty-two year period.

Where copyright already existed in a work under earlier legislation, it was to be extended to that provided for by the new act, except that if the copyright had been sold it would lapse at the end of the present term of copyright, unless an extension was agreed to by both the proprietor and the author. This ensured that authors would have the opportunity to be compensated for the fact that rights they had sold some years previously, possibly for a fixed sum, had become substantially more valuable.

In an early form of a compulsory license, the Privy Council was given the authority to authorize the republication of any book which the proprietor refused to publish after the death of the author.

Copyright in encyclopedias, magazines, periodicals, and series works was to be vested in the proprietors as though they were themselves the authors, saving that essays, articles, etc. first published as part of a collected periodical work, the republication right was to revert to the original author after twenty-eight years and continue for the remainder of the term.

The Act extended to dramatic works, previously covered by the Dramatic Copyright Act 1833, and to their "right of representation" which was to have the same term as copyright. The copyright and the right of representation of a dramatic work could be assigned separately. The Act also extended to musical works, and extended the provisions of the 1833 Act to cover such works.

Copyrights were declared to be personal property, and thus capable of bequest.

Library deposit and registration

One copy of any book printed after the Act came into force was to be submitted within one month of publication to the British Museum, at the expense of the publisher. The Bodleian Library, Cambridge University Library, the Advocates' Library and the Trinity College Library, Dublin, were all empowered to demand copies, which were to be delivered within a month of receiving the demand.

A registry of copyrights was to be kept at Stationers' Hall, and an entry was to be taken as prima facie proof of proprietorship; an assignation of copyright recorded in the register was to be considered as having the force of a legal deed. Entry in the register was a necessary precondition to suing under the Act, but an omission did not affect the legal title, simply the ability to sue.

Copyright infringement
Any illegal copies of work were forfeit, to become the property of the proprietor of the copyright, and could be recovered from their publisher by legal action. All editions published outside British jurisdiction were illegal; only the copyright proprietor was permitted to import them, and any unauthorized imports were likewise forfeit. Any illegally imported copies could be seized by customs agents, and fined on conviction at a rate of £10 plus double the value of each copy of the book.

The Act extended throughout the British Empire. It was repealed by sections 36 and 37(2) of, and schedule 3 to, the Copyright Act 1911.

Carlyle's petition 
Thomas Carlyle wrote a famous petition on the bill, published in the Examiner 7 April 1839.. . . That all useful labor is worthy of recompense; that all honest labor is worthy of the chance of recompense; that the giving and assuring to each man what recompense his labor has actually merited, may be said to be the business of all Legislation, Polity, Government, and Social Arrangement whatsoever among men;—a business indispensable to attempt, impossible to accomplish accurately, difficult to accomplish without inaccuracies that become enormous, unsupportable, and the parent of Social Confusions which never altogether end. . . .
. . . That your petitioner cannot discover himself to have done unlawfully in this his said labor of writing books, or to have become criminal, or have forfeited the law's protection thereby. Contrariwise your petitioner believes firmly that he is innocent in said labor; that if he be found in the long run to have written a genuine enduring book, his merit therein, and desert towards England and English and other men, will be considerable, not easily estimable in money; that on the other hand, if his book prove false and ephemeral, he and it will be abolished and forgotten, and no harm done. That, in this manner, your petitioner plays no unfair game against the world; his stake being life itself, so to speak (for the penalty is death by starvation), and the world's stake nothing till once it see the dice thrown; so that in any case the world cannot lose. . . .

See also
 Statute of Anne, the Copyright Act of  1710, which preceded it
 Copyright Act 1911, which succeeded it
 Copyright Act 1956
 Copyright, Designs and Patents Act 1988

Notes

References

The companion to the British almanac, for the year 1843, p. 151-3. London, 1843.
Chronological table of the statutes; HMSO, London. 1993.

External links
 Copyright Act, London (1842), Primary Sources on Copyright (1450-1900), eds L. Bently & M. Kretschmer, www.copyrighthistory.org.

United Kingdom Acts of Parliament 1842
United Kingdom copyright law
Copyright legislation